Mullens High School was a high school located in Mullens, Wyoming County, West Virginia, United States. It was closed in 1998 after consolidating with nearby Pineville High School to form Wyoming East High School.

Students from nearby Herndon High School had been consolidated into Mullens High School when that school closed in the 1990s.

Mullens High School's mascot was the Rebels and the school colors were blue and gray.

Feeder schools for Mullens High School included Mullens Middle School and Herndon Consolidated Elementary School.

Notable alumni
Jerome Anderson, former NBA player
Dan D'Antoni, current Marshall University men's basketball coach
Mike D'Antoni, Current NBA Head Coach of the Houston Rockets, former Marshall University Point Guard 
Terry Echols, former NFL player
Christy Martin, boxer
Rick Tolley, Marshall University Thundering Herd football coach 1969-1970

References

Defunct schools in West Virginia
Educational institutions disestablished in 1998
Former school buildings in the United States
Schools in Wyoming County, West Virginia
1998 disestablishments in West Virginia